Hydrodromidae is a family of prostigs in the order Trombidiformes. There is at least one genus, Hydrodroma, and at least one described species in Hydrodromidae, H. despiciens.

References

Further reading

 
 
 
 

Trombidiformes
Acari families